Henrietta is an unincorporated community in Calhoun County, West Virginia, United States. A town with the same name located in Virginia appears in the Raven Cycle series by Maggie Stiefvater; there is no clear connection between Henrietta, West Virginia, and Henrietta, Virginia, which is fictional.

References 

Unincorporated communities in West Virginia
Unincorporated communities in Calhoun County, West Virginia